The Winona Hotel is a former hotel building in Winona, Minnesota, United States, constructed in 1889.  It was listed on the National Register of Historic Places in 1983 for having local significance in the themes of architecture and commerce.  It was nominated for its locally distinctive Romanesque Revival architecture and origin as a hotel specifically constructed to accommodate out-of-town visitors during Winona's heyday as a fine theatre destination.  The Winona Hotel is also a contributing property to the Winona Commercial Historic District.  Now known as The Kensington, the building has been converted to senior apartments.

See also
 National Register of Historic Places listings in Winona County, Minnesota

References

External links
 The Kensington

1889 establishments in Minnesota
Buildings and structures in Winona, Minnesota
Defunct hotels in Minnesota
Hotel buildings completed in 1889
Hotel buildings on the National Register of Historic Places in Minnesota
Individually listed contributing properties to historic districts on the National Register in Minnesota
National Register of Historic Places in Winona County, Minnesota
Romanesque Revival architecture in Minnesota